Pulkau is a city in the district of Hollabrunn in Lower Austria, Austria.

Population

People 
 Walter Ullmann, Jewish historian, born here.

References

External links 
 Tourism (German)
 Europahaus Pulkau (German)

Cities and towns in Hollabrunn District